Xenophyllum is a genus of flowering plant in the family Asteraceae. The genus was erected in 1997 for several species formerly treated in genus Werneria. These plants grow in the high mountains of the Andes.

These species grow from rhizomes and form tight mats on the ground. Most have white ray florets and yellow or white disc florets.

Species include:

Xenophyllum acerosum
Xenophyllum amblydactylum
Xenophyllum ciliolatum
Xenophyllum crassum
Xenophyllum dactylophyllum
Xenophyllum decorum
Xenophyllum digitatum
Xenophyllum esquilachense
Xenophyllum fontii
Xenophyllum humile
Xenophyllum incisum
Xenophyllum lycopodioides
Xenophyllum marcidum
Xenophyllum poposum
Xenophyllum pseudodigitatum
Xenophyllum rigidum
Xenophyllum rosenii
Xenophyllum roseum
Xenophyllum sotarense
Xenophyllum staffordiae
Xenophyllum weddellii

References

 
Asteraceae genera
Taxonomy articles created by Polbot